Hyborhabdini is a beetle tribe in the family Cerambycidae described by Per Olof Christopher Aurivillius in 1911. Its only genus, Hyborhabdus, and only species, Hyborhabdus singularis, were described by the same author in the same year.

References

Lamiinae
Beetles described in 1911
Monotypic beetle genera
Taxa named by Per Olof Christopher Aurivillius